The Work and Socialism Party was a small leftist party in Somalia. It was founded by Abdulaziz Nuur Hersi, a lawyer educated Egypt and Italy. Some of its leading members were appointed to high posts by the military regime.

References

Sources

Defunct political parties in Somalia
Socialist parties in Somalia